Shapludu is a Bangladeshi political thriller by Golam Sohrab Dodul starring Arifin Shuvoo and Bidya Sinha Saha Mim which was released in theaters across Bangladesh on 27 September 2019.

Plot
Irfan has been the moral political guardian to Arman the way Ahsan has been to him. Then why does a series of unfortunate events- female trafficking, drug smuggling, disappearing of a foreign journalist, a bomb blast- occur in their small town of Thanchi? Who are they that prey on the aborigines at night? Who are they, who roam around with blood-spattered faces and weapons in hand during Vaisavi? Why does Arman continuously end up as the scapegoat? Where do someone's gains lie in Arman's death?

While finding answers to these questions, Arman falls into a rabbit hole of ghoulish truths, making him lose his credence. Right there starts Arman's striking journey to save Pushpa, and his country.

It is a story of Arman's love for Pushpa, of Ahsan and Irfan's love for their country. In some ways, it is a story of selling out your country, of Titli's life in orphanage, of Nazrul's sacrifice, and of Arman's mother's death. In hindsight, it is a story patriotism.

Society has its fair share of different types of people. Some amongst them resort to using others for their benefits; sometimes putting the entire society, even his nation at stake. They wear masquerades of noblemen. But once people hit rock bottom, they possess an inevitable ability to capsize and use those masquerades as a boomerang to the impostors. 'Shapludu' is a tale of those who turn the tables; a suspense thriller based on those who give those swindlers a taste of their own medicine in order to save themselves, their loved ones, and their nation

Cast
 Arifin Shuvoo as Arman
 Bidya Sinha Saha Mim as Pushpa
 Zahid Hasan as Irfan
 Tariq Anam Khan as Ahsanullah, Member of Parliament
 Salauddin Lavlu Nazrul Islam, ADC of DB
 Shatabdi Wadud as Zunayed
 Sushoma Sarkar as Flora
 Runa Khan as Salma Begum
 Marzuk Russell as Kibria
 Shilpi Sarkar Apu as Arman's mother
 Shahed Ali as Major Rustom
 Moushumi Hamid as Nazrul's wife
 Intekhab Dinar as Saqlain Morshed
 Boishakhi Ghosh as Mohua
 Yusof Mutahar as doctor
 Israt Punam

Production

Soundtrack

References 

2010s political thriller films
Bangladeshi political thriller films
Political action films
2019 films
Bengali-language Bangladeshi films